Alva Johnston (August 1, 1888 – November 23, 1950) was an American journalist and biographer who won a Pulitzer Prize for journalism in 1923.

Biography
Johnston was born in Sacramento, California.

He started out at the Sacramento Bee in 1906. From 1912 to 1928 he wrote for The New York Times, from 1928 to 1932 for the New York Herald Tribune, and then he wrote articles for The Saturday Evening Post and The New Yorker magazines. He won the 1923 Pulitzer Prize for Reporting for "his reports of the proceedings of the convention of the American Association for the Advancement of Science held in Cambridge, Massachusetts, in December, 1922."

He died on November 23, 1950, in Bronxville, New York.

Works 
 The Great Goldwyn (Random House, 1937) — about Samuel Goldwyn.
 The Case of Erle Stanley Gardner (William Morrow, 1947) — originally published in The Saturday Evening Post.
 The Legendary Mizners (Farrar, Straus and Young, 1953), illustrated by Reginald Marsh — about Addison and Wilson Mizner. The work has been superseded by later biographies.

See also

References

External links
 

1888 births
1950 deaths
American male journalists
Journalists from California
20th-century American biographers
American male biographers
Pulitzer Prize for Reporting winners
The New York Times writers
New York Herald Tribune people
The New Yorker people
The New York Times Pulitzer Prize winners
People from Yonkers, New York
Writers from Sacramento, California